Robert Francis "Bobby" Russell (2 July 1893 – 9 August 1943) was an Australian rules footballer who played with St Kilda in the Victorian Football League (VFL).

Death
He died on 9 August 1943.

Notes

External links 

1893 births
1943 deaths
Australian rules footballers from Victoria (Australia)
St Kilda Football Club players